Wolfgang Wilhelm (1906–1984) was a German-born screenwriter who later settled in Britain. He worked in the German film industry before leaving after the Nazi taking of power in 1933. He worked for a number of Britain's leading film producers.

Filmography

 Susanne Cleans Up (1930)
 I'll Stay with You (1931)
 A Woman Branded (1931)
 Spell of the Looking Glass (1932)
 There Goes the Bride (1932)
 No Day Without You (1933)
 Today Is the Day (1933)
 Give Her a Ring (1934)
 The Luck of a Sailor (1934)
 Brewster's Millions (1935)
 Farewell Again (1937)
 Yoshiwara (1937)
 The Silent Battle (1939)
 This Man Reuter (1940)
 Freedom Radio (1941)
 'Pimpernel' Smith (1941)
 Uncensored (1942)
 The Saint Meets the Tiger (1943)
 Escape to Danger (1943)
 Squadron Leader X (1943)
 Great Day (1945)
 I See a Dark Stranger (1946)
 Captain Boycott (1947)
 The End of the River (1947)
 A Kingdom for a House (1949)
 The Secret People (1952)
 The Great Game (1953)
 Don't Blame the Stork (1953)
 Holiday in Tyrol (1956)

Bibliography
 Bergfelder, Tim & Cargnelli, Christian. Destination London: German-speaking emigrés and British cinema, 1925-1950. Berghahn Books, 2008.

External links

1906 births
1984 deaths
German male screenwriters
Film people from Szczecin
German male writers
Emigrants from Nazi Germany to the United Kingdom
20th-century German screenwriters